Victoria Azarenka and Maria Kirilenko were the defending champions, but both decided not to participate.

Marina Erakovic and Heather Watson won the title, defeating Jarmila Gajdošová and Vania King in the final, 7–5, 7–6(9–7).

Seeds
The top seeds received a bye into the quarterfinals.

Draw

Draw

External links
 Main draw

2012 WTA Tour
2012 Doubles